Sanatruq I (also spelled Sanatruk I; Hatran Aramaic: 𐣮𐣭𐣨𐣣𐣥𐣲) was the first king of Hatra, an ancient city in northern Mesopotamia (present-day Iraq). 

He is known from more than 20 inscriptions found at Hatra and reigned from about 140 to 180. Only one of his inscriptions is dated (year 176/177). He was the son of Naṣru who governed Hatra from about 128 to 140. Sanatruq I was one of the first rulers of Hatra calling himself 𐣬𐣫𐣪 malka ("king"), but he bears also the title 𐣬𐣣𐣩𐣠 mry'  (administrator). He was granted the title of king by his Parthian overlord Vologases IV, due to the increasing strategic importance of the city during that period. Indeed, during the 2nd-century Hatra blossomed, serving as an important religious and commercial centre. The city was well fortified, previously successfully containing the attacks of the Roman emperor Trajan thrice. Hatra would remain a dependency of the Parthians until the emergence of the Sasanian Empire in 224.

Both of Sanatruq I's titles are also attested for his brother Wolgash. It is unclear whether they both reigned together and took of the title king of Arabs. Sanatruq I's name (meaning "he who defeats enemies") is of Iranian origin, a typical name used by the royal Parthian family, and a testament to the strong Parthian influence in Hatra. It was most likely under Sanatruq I that the Square Building of Hatra was constructed. The building bears many similarities to the later Sasanian fire temples.

Sanatruq I was succeeded by Abdsamiya. The relation between the two rulers are uncertain; there is no evidence of them being from the same dynasty. Abdsamiya never used the name of his father. However, the name of Abdsamiya's successor was Sanatruq II, which may suggest a continuation of Sanatruq I's line. The Hatran statues commemorating Sanatruq I and his dynasty were not removed, which indicates if a change of dynasty occurred, it was non-violent.

References

Sources
 

 
 
 
 
 
 

2nd-century Arabs
Hatra
2nd-century monarchs in the Middle East
Vassal rulers of the Parthian Empire